Joseph Rose may refer to:

 Joseph Rose (journalist) (born 1969), American journalist and radio personality
 Joseph Rose (plasterer) (1745–1799), English plasterer (stuccoist)
 Joseph Nelson Rose (1862–1928), American botanist